Teniorhinus is a genus of skippers in the family Hesperiidae.

Species
Teniorhinus harona (Westwood, 1881)
Teniorhinus herilus (Hopffer, 1855)
Teniorhinus ignita (Mabille, 1877)
Teniorhinus niger (Druce, 1910)
Teniorhinus watsoni Holland, 1892

References

Seitz, A. Die Gross-Schmetterlinge der Erde 13: Die Afrikanischen Tagfalter. Plate XIII 77

External links
Natural History Museum Lepidoptera genus database

Erionotini
Hesperiidae genera